Svemir Đorđić (born 16 May 1948) is a Yugoslav former footballer who played as a midfielder.

Career
After spending two seasons with Vojvodina, Đorđić was transferred to Partizan in 1968. He remained with the club for eight years, making 186 league appearances and scoring 32 goals. In 1976, Đorđić moved abroad to Switzerland and played for two seasons with Sion. He would also play for fellow Swiss clubs Lausanne and Monthey.

Honours
Partizan
 Yugoslav First League: 1975–76

References

External links
 
 

1948 births
Living people
Footballers from Osijek
Serbs of Croatia
Yugoslav footballers
Association football midfielders
FK Vojvodina players
FK Partizan players
FC Sion players
FC Lausanne-Sport players
FC Monthey players
Yugoslav First League players
Swiss Super League players
Yugoslav expatriate footballers
Expatriate footballers in Switzerland
Yugoslav expatriate sportspeople in Switzerland
Yugoslav football managers